Pedro Blanco (born 28 June 1958) is a Colombian footballer. He played in one match for the Colombia national football team in 1983. He was also part of Colombia's squad for the 1983 Copa América tournament.

References

External links
 

1958 births
Living people
Colombian footballers
Colombia international footballers
Place of birth missing (living people)
Association football defenders